Masoud Zoohori is an Iranian-Australian media proprietor, darts player and the founder president of Iranian Darts Association.
He is the CEO of Radio Neshat.

Career
Zoohori is one of the founders and promoters of darts in Iran. He was the founder and the first head of Iranian Darts Association.
Zoohori has tried to develop a darts community in Iran despite the limitations and restrictions: "Foreigners only play darts in bars and clubs, but we have shown that it can be a sporting activity enjoyed without any alcohol."

Publications
 The Allures of Darts: Methods, Training, Techniques and Tactics, and General Rules and Regulations, Masoud Zoohori, Tehran: Kavoshpardaz 2008, 
 The Allures of Darts: Training, Techniques and Tactics, and the Regulations, Masoud Zoohori, Tehran: Bamdad-e Ketab 2009,

References

Living people
Iranian darts players
Iranian company founders
Australian mass media company founders
Australian darts players
Iranian emigrants to Australia
Place of birth missing (living people)
Year of birth missing (living people)